William Percy French (1 May 1854 – 24 January 1920) was an Irish songwriter, author, poet, entertainer and painter.

Life 
French was born at Clooneyquinn House, near Tulsk, County Roscommon, the son of an Anglo-Irish landlord, Christopher French, and Susan Emma French (née Percy). He was the third of nine children. His younger sister, Emily later Emily de Burg Daly was also a writer.

He was educated in England at Kirk Langley and Windermere College before going to Foyle College in Derry and wrote his first successful song while studying at Trinity College Dublin (TCD) in 1877 for a smoking concert. The song, "Abdul Abulbul Amir", was published in 200 copies for £5 and French sold each copy for 2s6d, making a small fortune. However, he fatally omitted to register copyright on the song and lost all the subsequent income from the royalties as it was re-published without his name. The royalties were restored to his widow and daughters after his death. The song later became hugely popular and was falsely claimed by other authors. Although he lost copyright, French always claimed authorship and did so on the sleeve of his song "Slattery's Mounted Fut" (1889) and in every issue of the weekly The Jarvey. Brendan O'Dowda claimed to have discovered, via the popularity of versions of the song at the American military academies in the 1980s, that French had written the lyrics while at Trinity College. He claimed responsibility for the restoration of the royalties in the 1980s. Ettie French gives a different account of how the royalties were restored in her book Willie (1995) about her father's life. She claimed the royalties were restored in the 1940s to the family. The ballad resembles a comic opera spoof. "Pot Skivers" were the chambermaids at the college, thus Ivan "Potschjinski" Skivar would be a less than noble prince, and as Bulbul is an Arabic dialectic name of the nightingale, Abdul was thus a foppish "nightingale" amir (prince). When French died, not at all wealthy, he was owed a fortune in unpaid royalties. A windfall in royalties came to his family in the 1940s from "Abdullah Abulbul Ameer" and "Phil the Fluter's Ball".

French graduated from TCD as a civil engineer in 1881 and joined the Board of Works in County Cavan as an Inspector of Drains. It is said that he wrote his best songs during this period. He also painted: he was a prolific painter of watercolour landscapes and, during this period, considered art to be his true vocation. In fact, when he became well-known later in his life, his paintings from his time as a civil engineer became fashionable and sought after. The volcano Krakatoa erupted in 1883 while French was in Cavan, and the particles of volcanic ash caused dramatic sunsets all over the world. French painted some of his finest landscapes in this period as he captured the spectacular skies. French exhibited his pictures in the Royal Hibernian Academy (RHA) and sometimes gave them short lyrical poems for titles, such as "Only the sullen seas that flow/ And ebb forever more,/ But tarry awhile sad heart and, lo!/ A light on that lonely shore".

When the Board of Works reduced its staff around 1888, French turned to journalism as the editor of The Jarvey, a weekly comic paper. When the paper failed, French's long and successful career as a songwriter and entertainer began. He had lived by the canal in Dublin at 35 Mespil Road before going to London. He famously wrote to his friends when he moved there: "We have come to live by the canal, do drop in". A granite seat was erected in 1988 on the canal near his home, dedicated to French. It was sponsored by the Oriel Gallery and bears another witticism of French's: "Remember me is all I ask, / And if that memory proves a task, forget".

French was renowned for composing and singing comic songs and gained considerable distinction with such songs as Phil the Fluther's Ball, Slattery's Mounted Foot, and The Mountains of Mourne (this last was one of several written with his friend, stage partner and fellow composer, Houston Collisson). The song was set to the same air as Thomas Moore's "Bendmeer's Stream" which, in turn, was adapted from the old Irish Air "Carraigdhoun". French also wrote many sketches and amusing parodies, the most famous of which is The Queen's After-Dinner Speech, written on the occasion of Queen Victoria's visit to Dublin in 1900, in which French drolly suggests "There's a slate off Willie Yeats". In addition, he wrote several poems, some he called "poems of pathos". Many of his poems are on the theme of emigration. He was a regular contributor to The Irish Cyclist, a weekly comic journal.

"Are Ye Right There Michael", a song ridiculing the state of the rail system in rural County Clare caused such embarrassment to the rail company that – according to a persistent local legend – it led to a libel action against French. According to the story, French arrived late at the court, and when questioned by the judge he responded "Your honour, I travelled by the West Clare Railway", resulting in the case being thrown out.

In January 1920, when he was 65 years old, French became ill while performing in Glasgow. He died from pneumonia in Formby, England at the home of his cousin, Canon Richardson of Green Lea, College Avenue, on 24 January 1920. His grave is in the churchyard of St Luke's Church, Formby, Merseyside.

Memorials 
In 1988, The Oriel Gallery sponsored a seat erected by the OPW opposite 35 Mespil Road, on the canal, Dublin. French lived there from 1894-1900 with his second wife and family. When he moved there, he sent out a communication to his friend: 'We have come to live by the canal, Do drop in!'

A sculpture of a park bench and plaque depicting his likeness by Brid Ni Rinn was installed on the spot where French was inspired to write "The Mountains of Mourne" in Red Island Park, Skerries, County Dublin, in 2008.

A statue of French sitting on a park bench in the town centre of Ballyjamesduff honours him and his song Come Back, Paddy Reilly, to Ballyjamesduff.

In March 2020, a memorial to French was unveiled in Newcastle, County Down, in sight of the Mountains of Mourne, to mark the centenary of his death.

Family 
After French's job at the Board of Works in Cavan ended, he was made editor of a new comic magazine, The Jarvey, by Richard J. Mecredy, publisher and editor of The Irish Cyclist since 1886. It was located at Middle Abbey Street, Dublin. French had been contributing comic pieces to The Irish Cyclist all through his Cavan years. He married Ethel ("Ettie") Kathleen Armitage (Armytage) Moore in June 1890 on the strength of his income from The Jarvey. Ettie contributed highly accomplished drawings to it and wrote a gossip column called "Chit Chatters". Bernadette Lowry has found many references to this column and other pieces from The Jarvey in Finnegans Wake by James Joyce. In her groundbreaking discoveries, she argues that French is the overarching model for the main hero for the cosmic "everyman" Finnegan (HCE) of Joyce's final novel. She also identified for the first time in 80 years since the publication of the indecipherable novel, the critical reference to French's death in Liverpool in a key chapter of Finnegans Wake, a crucial discovery, unlocking much of Joyce's impenetrable novel in her landmark new book Sounds of Manymirth on the Night's Ear Ringing: Percy French (1854–1920) His Jarvey Years and Joyce's Haunted Inkbottle. by Carmen Eblana AE productions. The title of Lowry's book is taken from a line from Finnegans Wake wherein Joyce parodied two of Thomas Moore's melodies in homage to French's demise in Liverpool. The Moore's melody is "Sounds of Mirth in the Night-Air Ringing" set to the traditional air "The Priest in His Boots", and is also a reference to William Houston Collisson who died a week after French, who was an Anglican clergyman and who collaborated musically with French for over two decades, setting much of French's compositions to music. French is also the subject of the reference in Finnegans Wake "the troubadour who mangled Moore's melodies" because he parodied so many of them in The Jarvey and in The Irish Cyclist. 

A jarvey was the driver of a Jaunting car. Valentine Vousden wrote a famous song, "The Irish Jaunting Car" in celebration of Queen Victoria's visit to Ireland in the late 1850s where she took a ride on an Irish jaunting car in Killarney. Percy French wrote his own version of the song for his comic opera The Knight of the Road (1891). The hero of Finnegans Wake is also referred to as a Val Vousden.This opera is mentioned in Joyce's Ulysses too.

French's first wife, Ettie Armitage Moore, was born in 1871, second daughter of William Armytage-Moore, brother of the Countess of Annesley (wife of the third Earl). Ettie (and their daughter) died in childbirth at the age of 20 and is buried in Mount Jerome cemetery, Dublin. Her sister, Priscilla Armitage-Moore, who became a famous society beauty, married her cousin and became the fifth Countess of Annesley. She lived at Castlewellan estate in County Down. Four years after Ettie's death, French married Helen Sheldon (Lennie) from Warwickshire, whom he met when she visited Dublin to sing in the chorus of his opera Strongbow. They had three daughters, Ettie (1894-1993) named after his first wife, Mollie, and Joan. French and his family moved to London around 1900 and lived at St John's Wood.

Songs 
The following songs are attributed to Percy French:

 Abdul Abulbul Amir (1877)
 Andy McElroe (1888)
 Are Ye Right There Michael? (1897)
 Come Back, Paddy Reilly, to Ballyjamesduff (1912)
 The Darlin' Girl from Clare
 Donegan's Daughter (1908)
 Drumcolligher
 Eileen Oge (The Pride of Petravore or McGrath the Cattle-Jobber)
 The Emigrants's Letter (Cutting the Corn in Creeslough) (1910)
 Father O'Callaghan (1910)
 Fighting McGuire
 Flanagan's Flying Machine (1911)
 The Fortunes of Finnegan
 The Girl on a Big Black Mare
 The Hoodoo (1910)
 I Fought a Fierce Hyena
 Jim Wheelahan's Automobeel
 The Kerry Courting (1909)
 The Killyran Wrackers (1914)
 Kitty Gallagher
 Larry Mick McGarry (1915)
 Little Brigid Flynn

 Maguire's Motor Bike (1906)
 The Mary Ann McHugh
 Mat Hannigan's Aunt (1892)
 McBreen's Heifer
 The Mountains of Mourne (1896)
 Mick's Hotel
 Mrs Brady (1907)
 Mulligan's Masquerade
 The Night that Miss Cooney Eloped
 No More of Yer Golfin' for Me (1906)
 The Oklahoma Rose (1910)
 Phil the Fluther's Ball
 Pretendy Land (1907)
 Rafferty's Racin' Mare (1906)
 A Sailor Courted a Farmer's Daughter (parody of the folk song)
 Slattery's Mounted Foot (1889)
 Sweet Marie
 Tullinahaw (1910)
 When Erin Wakes (1900)
 Whistlin' Phil McHugh
 Who Said the Hook Never Hurted the Worms?

Operatic works 
Collaborations with William Houston Collisson (1865–1920)
 The Knight of the Road (1891), later known as The Irish Girl (published c. 1918)
 Strongbow (1892)
 Midsummer Madness (1892)
 Noah's Ark (1906)
 Freda and the Fairies

Art 
Artworks by French have increased in value. On 20 September 2005, the Percy French watercolour landscape Where ever I go my heart turns back to the County Mayo was sold by Dublin auctioneers Whyte's for a then record price of €44,000. It is also known as "The Iveagh Percy French" as it came from the Guinness family collection. The story goes that the purchaser had "buyer's remorse", and the painting was purchased immediately by a gallerist. Some ten days after this auction, the Apollo Gallery sold this iconic painting on to an American collector for €65,000.

A comprehensive biography of French, focusing on his paintings, Lead Kindly Light, was produced and written by Oliver Nulty of the Oriel Gallery in 2002, the culmination of his life's work promoting French at a time of official neglect. Bernadette Lowry edited the publication and contributed the essay "Percy French in a Wider Cultural Context", which assessed the wider cultural significance of French, especially underscoring his ear for idiom and his matchless facility with Hiberno-English. The title was taken from French's favourite hymn "Lead Kindly Light" by John Henry Newman. It was chosen as a metaphor for French's paintings as the light always leads gently into his pictures. A runner-up title which the Oriel considered was Tones That Are Tender from French's song "Come Back Paddy Reilly". French's landscape paintings are described in The Watercolours of Ireland by Patricia Butler as "laden with atmosphere".

When Oliver Nulty (d. 2005) established the Oriel Gallery in Clare Street, Dublin, he opened with a Percy French and George Russell exhibition. Nulty promoted French from the day he opened the gallery in 1968 and mounted at least 15 solo exhibitions of French and several group shows featuring French, one opened by Peter Ustinov. Nulty was a collector for years before opening a gallery. He had been an antiques dealer and noticed that Irish visual art was neglected. He once witnessed the auctioneer fail to sell a George Russell painting for 2 shillings, until a coal scuttle was added to the lot. As well as mounting several solo exhibitions of French's paintings he published several catalogues of French's watercolours. French's daughters Joan and Ettie were regular visitors to the Oriel Gallery from the early 1970s.

French's archive currently resides in the North Down Museum, Bangor, County Down where researchers are welcome to view material by appointment with the museum.

Bibliography 
 Emily de Burg Daly : Chronicles and Poems of Percy French, with an introduction by Katharine Tynan (Dublin: Talbot Press, 1922).
 Emily de Burg Daly Daly: Prose, Poems and Parodies of Percy French, with an introduction by Alfred Perceval Graves (Dublin: Talbot Press, 1929; 3/1962).
 James N. Healy: Percy French and his Songs (Cork: Mercier Press, 1966).
 Brendan O'Dowda: The World of Percy French (Belfast: Blackstaff Press, 1981; 3/1997).
 Alan Tongue: A Picture of Percy French (Belfast: Greystone Books, 1990).
 Ettie French: Willie: A Tribute to Percy French (Holywood, County Down: Percy French Society, 1994).
 Oliver Nulty (ed. by Bernadette Lowry): Lead Kindly Light. Celebrating 150 Years of Percy French (Dublin: Oriel Gallery Dublin Gallery, 2002).
 Berrie O'Neill: Tones that are Tender: Percy French, 1854–1920 (Dublin: Lilliput Press, 2016).
 Bernadette Lowry: Sounds of Manymirth on the Night's Ear Ringing. Percy French (1854-1920): His Jarvey Years and Joyce's Haunted Inkbottle; with a foreword by Dr Robert Mohr and an afterword by Martin Mansergh (Dublin: Carmen Eblana Productions, 2021).

See also 
 Culture of Ireland
 Music of Ireland

References

External links 

 The Percy French Summer School, Roscommon
 Percy French at theoriel.com
 Example of painting by Percy French
 The Mountains Of Mourne Sweep Down To The Sea – Feature
 Sculpture of Percy French by Alan Hall
 Directions to Percy French's Birthplace
 The Percy French 100 Years Events page 1920-2020
 Sounds of Manymirth

1854 births
1920 deaths
19th-century Irish painters
20th-century Irish painters
Irish male painters
Alumni of Trinity College Dublin
Irish Anglicans
Irish classical composers
Irish engineers
Irish songwriters
Irish opera composers
Male opera composers
People educated at Foyle College
People from County Roscommon
19th-century Irish male artists
20th-century Irish male artists